This is a list of the Record Report Top 100 number-one singles of 2014. Chart rankings are based on radio play and are issued weekly.

Number ones by week

References

Number-one singles
Venezuela
2014